Talkin' About Life and Death is an album by Polish jazz band, Miłość, and American jazz musician, Lester Bowie. The songs were recorded in two days in July 1997 in Gdańsk.

Track listing
 "Venus in Furs" (Reed)
 "A Tribute To Drukpa Kunley" (Tymański)
 "Maple Leaves" (Ives)
 "Duet" (Tymański)
 "What If" (Bowie)
 "Fukan Zazen-gi" (Tymański)
 "Facing the Wall" (Tymański)
 "Let's Get Serious" (Tymański)
 "The Bardo of Life" (Tymański)
 "Impressions" (Coltrane)

Personnel
 Lester Bowie – trumpet
 Mikołaj Trzaska – alto & soprano saxophones
 Leszek Możdżer – grand piano
 Tymon Tymański – double bass, voice, leader
 Jacek Olter – drums

External links
 Biodro Records

1999 albums
Lester Bowie albums
Miłość albums
Biodro Records albums